This is a list of school districts in California.

California school districts are of several varieties, usually a Unified district, which includes all of the Elementary and High Schools in the same geographic area; Elementary school districts, which includes K–6 or K–8 schools only, which may have several elementary districts within one high school district's geographic area; and High School Districts, which include one or more high schools in the same geographic area. Elementary districts sometimes includes the word Elementary within their names, but often do not. Sometimes the words Joint and/or Union are included in the district's name.  A joint school district serves students from more than one county.  A union elementary school district was formed as the result of a merger between two previous school districts, while a union high school district serves students from multiple elementary school districts.

The typical district grade configurations in California are elementary (K–8), high (9–12), and unified (K–12), but there are some K–6 elementary districts and a handful of 7–12 high school districts. Districts sometimes merge or consolidate; the number of districts can change annually.

Most of these are listed here, by their public name which they call themselves on their District websites.

Alameda County

 Alameda Unified School District
 Albany Unified School District
 Berkeley Unified School District
 Castro Valley Unified School District
 Dublin Unified School District
 Emery Unified School District
 Fremont Unified School District
 Hayward Unified School District
 Livermore Valley Joint Unified School District
Mountain House Elementary School District
 New Haven Unified School District
 Newark Unified School District
 Oakland Unified School District
 Piedmont Unified School District
 Pleasanton Unified School District
 San Leandro Unified School District
 San Lorenzo Unified School District
 Sunol Glen Unified School District

Alpine County
Alpine County Unified School District

Amador County
 Amador County Unified School District

Butte County

 Bangor Union Elementary School District 
 Biggs Unified School District 
 Chico Unified School District
 Durham Unified School District
 Golden Feather Union Elementary School District 
 Gridley Unified School District
 Manzanita Elementary School District 
 Oroville City Elementary School District
 Oroville Union High School District
 Palermo Union School District
 Paradise Unified School District
 Pioneer Union Elementary School District 
 Thermalito Union School District

Calaveras County

Bret Harte Union High School District
Calaveras Unified School District
Mark Twain Union Elementary School District 
Vallecito Union School District

Colusa County

 Colusa Unified School District
 Maxwell Unified School District 
 Pierce Joint Unified School District 
 Williams Unified School District

Contra Costa County

 Acalanes Union High School District
 Antioch Unified School District
 Brentwood Union School District
 Byron Union School District 
 Canyon School District 
 John Swett Unified School District
 Knightsen Elementary School District 
 Lafayette School District
 Liberty Union High School District
 Martinez Unified School District
 Moraga School District
 Mount Diablo Unified School District
 Oakley Union Elementary School District
 Orinda Union School District
 Pittsburg Unified School District
 San Ramon Valley Unified School District
 Walnut Creek School District 
 West Contra Costa Unified School District

Del Norte County
 Del Norte Unified School District

El Dorado County

 Black Oak Mine Unified School District
 Buckeye Union School District 
 Camino Union School District
 El Dorado Union High School District
 Gold Oak Union School District
 Gold Trail Union School District
 Indian Diggings School District 
 Lake Tahoe Unified School District
 Latrobe School District
 Mother Lode Union School District
 Pioneer Union School District 
 Placerville Union School District 
 Pollock Pines School District 
 Rescue Union School District
 Silver Fork School District

Fresno County

 Alvina Elementary Charter School District 
 Big Creek Elementary School District 
 Burrel Union Elementary School District
 Caruthers Unified School District 
 Central Unified School District
 Clay Joint Elementary School District 
 Clovis Unified School District
 Coalinga-Huron Unified School District 
 Firebaugh-Las Deltas Unified School District 
 Fowler Unified School District
 Fresno Unified School District
 Golden Plains Unified School District 
 Kerman Unified School District
 Kings Canyon Unified School District
 Kingsburg Elementary Charter School District
 Kingsburg Joint Union High School District
 Laton Joint Unified School District 
 Mendota Unified School District
 Monroe Elementary School District 
 Orange Center Elementary School District 
 Pacific Union School District
 Parlier Unified School District 
 Pine Ridge Elementary School District 
 Raisin City Elementary School District 
 Riverdale Unified School District 
 Sanger Unified School District
 Selma Unified School District
 Sierra Unified School District
 Washington Colony Elementary School District 
 Washington Unified School District
 West Park Elementary School District 
 Westside Elementary School District

Glenn County

 Capay Joint Union School District 
 Hamilton Union School District 
 Lake Elementary School District 
 Orland Unified School District 
 Plaza Elementary School District 
 Princeton Joint Unified School District 
 Stony Creek Joint Unified School District 
 Willows Unified School District

Humboldt County

 Arcata School District
 Big Lagoon Union Elementary School District
 Blue Lake Union Elementary School District
 Bridgeville Elementary School District
 Cuddeback Elementary School District
 Cutten Elementary School District 
 Eureka City Schools 
 Ferndale Unified School District
 Fieldbrook Elementary School District
 Fortuna Elementary School District
 Fortuna Union High School District 
 Freshwater School District
 Garfield Elementary School District 
 Green Point Elementary School District
 Hydesville Elementary School District
 Jacoby Creek Charter School District
 Klamath-Trinity Joint Unified School District
 Kneeland Elementary School District
 Loleta Union Elementary School District
 Maple Creek Elementary School District
 Mattole Unified School District
 McKinleyville Union School District
 Northern Humboldt High School District
 Orick Elementary School District
 Pacific Union School District
 Peninsula Union School District
 Rio Dell School District
 Scotia Union School District
 South Bay Union School District
 Southern Humboldt Unified School District
 Trinidad Union School District

Imperial County

 Brawley Elementary School District 
 Brawley Union High School District
 Calexico Unified School District
 Calipatria Unified School District 
 Central Union High School District
 El Centro School District 
 Heber School District 
 Holtville Unified School District
 Imperial Unified School District
 Magnolia Union School District 
 McCabe Union School District 
 Meadows Union School District 
 Mulberry Elementary School District
 San Pasqual Valley Unified School District 
 Seeley Union School District
 Westmorland Union Elementary School District

Inyo County

Big Pine Unified School District 
Bishop Unified School District
Death Valley Unified School District
Lone Pine Unified School District
Owens Valley Unified School District
Round Valley School District

Kern County

 Arvin Union School District
 Bakersfield City School District
 Beardsley School District
 Blake School District
 Buttonwillow Union School District 
 Caliente Union School District 
 Delano Union Elementary School District
 Delano Joint Union High School District
 Di Giorgio School District
 Edison School District
 El Tejon Unified School District
 Elk Hills School District
 Fairfax School District
 Fruitvale School District
 General Shafter School District 
 Greenfield Union School District
 Kern High School District
 Kernville Union School District
 Lakeside Union School District
 Lamont School District 
 Linns Valley-Poso Flat Union School District 
 Lost Hills Union School District 
 Maple Elementary School District 
 Maricopa Unified School District
 McFarland Unified School District 
 McKittrick Elementary School District 
 Midway School District 
 Mojave Unified School District
 Muroc Joint Unified School District
 Norris School District
 Panama Buena Vista Union School District
 Pond Union School District 
 Richland School District 
 Rio Bravo-Greeley Union School District 
 Rosedale Union School District
 Semitropic School District 
 Sierra Sands Unified School District
 South Fork Union School District 
 Southern Kern Unified School District
 Standard School District
 Taft City School District
 Taft Union High School District
 Tehachapi Unified School District
 Vineland School District 
 Wasco Union Elementary School District
 Wasco Union High School District

Kings County

 Armona Union School District
 Central Union Elementary School District
 Corcoran Unified School District 
 Hanford Elementary School District
 Hanford Joint Union High School District
 Island Union Elementary School District 
 Kings River-Hardwick Joint Union School District 
 Kit Carson Union School District 
 Lakeside School District
 Lemoore Union Elementary School District
 Lemoore Union High School District
 Pioneer Union Elementary School District
 Reef-Sunset Unified School District

Lake County

 Kelseyville Unified School District 
 Konocti Unified School District
 Lakeport Unified School District 
 Lucerne Elementary School District 
 Middletown Unified School District
 Upper Lake Unified School District

Lassen County

Big Valley Joint Unified School District 
Fort Sage Unified School District 
Janesville Union Elementary School District 
Johnstonville Elementary School District 
Lassen Union High School District 
Ravendale-Termo Elementary School District 
Richmond Elementary School District 
Shaffer Union Elementary School District
Susanville School District 
Westwood Unified School District

Los Angeles County

ABC Unified School District
Acton-Agua Dulce Unified School District
Alhambra Unified School District
Antelope Valley Union High School District
Arcadia Unified School District
Azusa Unified School District
Baldwin Park Unified School District
Bassett Unified School District
Bellflower Unified School District
Beverly Hills Unified School District
Bonita Unified School District
Burbank Unified School District
Castaic Union School District
Centinela Valley Union High School District
Charter Oak Unified School District
Claremont Unified School District
Compton Unified School District
Covina-Valley Unified School District
Culver City Unified School District
Downey Unified School District
Duarte Unified School District
East Whittier City School District
Eastside Union School District
El Monte City School District
El Monte Union High School District
El Rancho Unified School District
El Segundo Unified School District
Garvey School District
Glendale Unified School District
Glendora Unified School District
Gorman Joint School District
Hacienda La Puente Unified School District
Hawthorne School District
Hermosa Beach City School District
Hughes-Elizabeth Lakes Union Elementary School District
Inglewood Unified School District
Keppel Union School District
La Cañada Unified School District
Lancaster School District
Las Virgenes Unified School District
Lawndale Elementary School District
Lennox School District
Little Lake City School District
Long Beach Unified School District
Los Angeles Unified School District
Los Nietos School District 
Lynwood Unified School District
Manhattan Beach Unified School District
Monrovia Unified School District
Montebello Unified School District
Mountain View School District
Newhall School District
Norwalk–La Mirada Unified School District
Palmdale School District
Palos Verdes Peninsula Unified School District
Paramount Unified School District
Pasadena Unified School District
Pomona Unified School District
Redondo Beach Unified School District
Rosemead School District
Rowland Unified School District
San Gabriel Unified School District
San Marino Unified School District
Santa Monica–Malibu Unified School District
Saugus Union School District
South Pasadena Unified School District
South Whittier School District 
Sulphur Springs School District
Temple City Unified School District
Torrance Unified School District
Valle Lindo Elementary School District
Walnut Valley Unified School District
West Covina Unified School District
Westside Union School District
Whittier City School District
Whittier Union High School District
William S. Hart Union High School District
Wilsona Elementary School District
Wiseburn Unified School District

Madera County

 Alview-Dairyland School District 
 Bass Lake Joint Union School District 
 Chawanakee Unified School District 
 Chowchilla School District
 Chowchilla Union High School District
 Golden Valley Unified School District
 Madera Unified School District
 Raymond Knowles Union Elementary School District
 Yosemite Unified School District

Marin County

 Bolinas-Stinson Union School District
 Kentfield School District 
 Laguna Joint School District 
 Lagunitas School District
 Larkspur-Corte Madera School District
 Mill Valley School District
 Miller Creek Elementary School District
 Nicasio School District
 Novato Unified School District
 Reed Union School District
 Ross School District 
 Ross Valley School District
 San Rafael Elementary School District
 San Rafael High School District
 Sausalito Marin City School District
 Shoreline Unified School District
 Tamalpais Union High School District

Mariposa County
 Mariposa County Unified School District

Mendocino County

 Anderson Valley Unified School District
 Arena Union Elementary School District
 Fort Bragg Unified School District
 Laytonville Unified School District
 Leggett Valley Unified School District
 Manchester Union Elementary School District 
 Mendocino Unified School District
 Point Arena Joint Union High School District 
 Potter Valley Community Unified School District
 Round Valley Unified School District
 Ukiah Unified School District
 Willits Unified School District

Merced County

 Atwater Elementary School District
 Ballico-Cressey Elementary School District
 Delhi Unified School District
 Dos Palos Oro Loma Joint Unified School District
 El Nido Elementary School District
 Gustine Unified School District
 Hilmar Unified School District
 Le Grand Union Elementary School District
 Le Grand Union High School District
 Livingston Union School District
 Los Banos Unified School District
 McSwain Union Elementary School District
 Merced City Elementary School District
 Merced River Union Elementary School District
 Merced Union High School District
 Plainsburg Union Elementary School District
 Planada Elementary School District
 Snelling-Merced Falls Union Elementary School District
 Weaver Union Elementary School District
 Winton Elementary School District

Modoc County

 Modoc Joint Unified School District 
 Surprise Valley Joint Unified School District 
 Tulelake Basin Joint Unified School District

Mono County

 Eastern Sierra Unified School District
 Mammoth Unified School District

Monterey County

 Alisal Union Elementary School District
 Big Sur Unified School District
 Bradley Union Elementary School District
 Carmel Unified School District
 Chualar Union Elementary School District
 Gonzales Unified School District
 Graves Elementary School District
 Greenfield Union Elementary School District
 King City Union Elementary School District
 Lagunita Elementary School District
 Mission Union Elementary School District
 Monterey Peninsula Unified School District
 North Monterey County Unified School District
 Pacific Grove Unified School District
 Salinas City Elementary School District
 Salinas Union High School District
 San Antonio Union Elementary School District
 San Ardo Union Elementary School District
 San Lucas Union Elementary School District
 Santa Rita Union Elementary School District
 Soledad Unified School District
 South Monterey County Joint Union High School District
 Spreckels Union Elementary School District
 Washington Union School District

Napa County

Calistoga Joint Unified School District 
Howell Mountain Elementary School District 
Napa Valley Unified School District
Pope Valley Union Elementary School District
St. Helena Unified School District

Nevada County

 Chicago Park School District
 Clear Creek School District
 Grass Valley School District
 Nevada City School District
 Nevada Joint Union High School District
 Penn Valley Union Elementary School District
 Pleasant Ridge Union School District
 Twin Ridges School District
 Union Hill School District

Orange County

 Anaheim Elementary School District
 Anaheim Union High School District
 Brea Olinda Unified School District
 Buena Park School District
 Capistrano Unified School District
 Centralia School District
 Cypress School District
 Fountain Valley School District
 Fullerton Joint Union High School District
 Fullerton School District
 Garden Grove Unified School District
 Huntington Beach City School District
 Huntington Beach Union High School District
 Irvine Unified School District
 La Habra City School District
 Laguna Beach Unified School District
 Los Alamitos Unified School District
 Lowell Joint School District
 Magnolia School District
 Newport-Mesa Unified School District
 Ocean View School District
 Orange Unified School District
 Placentia-Yorba Linda Unified School District
 Saddleback Valley Unified School District
 Santa Ana Unified School District
 Savanna School District
 Tustin Unified School District
 Westminster School District

Placer County

Ackerman Charter School District
Alta Dutch Flat Elementary School District
Auburn Union Elementary School District
Colfax Elementary School District
Dry Creek Joint Elementary School District
Eureka Union School District
Foresthill Union School District
Loomis Union School District
Newcastle Elementary School District
Placer Hills Union School District
Placer Union High School District
Rocklin Unified School District
Roseville City Elementary School District
Roseville Joint Union High School District
Tahoe-Truckee Unified School District
Western Placer Unified School District

Plumas County
Plumas Unified School District

Riverside County

Alvord Unified School District
Banning Unified School District
Beaumont Unified School District
Coachella Valley Unified School District
Corona-Norco Unified School District
Desert Center Unified School District
Desert Sands Unified School District
Hemet Unified School District
Jurupa Unified School District
Lake Elsinore Unified School District
Menifee Union School District
Moreno Valley Unified School District
Murrieta Valley Unified School District
Nuview Union Elementary School District
Palm Springs Unified School District
Palo Verde Unified School District
Perris Elementary School District
Perris Union High School District
Riverside Unified School District
Romoland Elementary School District
San Jacinto Unified School District
Temecula Valley Unified School District
Val Verde Unified School District

Sacramento County

Arcohe Union Elementary School District 
Center Unified School District
Elk Grove Unified School District
Elverta Joint Elementary School District
Folsom Cordova Unified School District
Galt Joint Union Elementary School District
Galt Joint Union High School District
Natomas Unified School District
River Delta Unified School District
Robla School District 
Sacramento City Unified School District
San Juan Unified School District
Twin Rivers Unified School District

San Benito County

Aromas/San Juan Unified School District
Bitterwater-Tully Joint Union Elementary School District
Cienega Union Elementary School District
Hollister Elementary School District
Jefferson Elementary School District
North County Joint Union Elementary School District
Panoche Elementary School District
San Benito High School District
Southside Elementary School District
Tres Pinos Union Elementary School District
Willow Grove Union Elementary School District

San Bernardino County

Adelanto School District
Alta Loma School District
Apple Valley Unified School District
Baker Valley Unified School District
Barstow Unified School District
Bear Valley Unified School District
Central School District
Chaffey Joint Union High School District
Chino Valley Unified School District
Colton Joint Unified School District
Cucamonga School District
Etiwanda School District
Fontana Unified School District
Helendale School District
Hesperia Unified School District
Lucerne Valley Unified School District
Morongo Unified School District
Mountain View School District
Mt Baldy School District
Needles Unified School District
Ontario-Montclair School District
Oro Grande School District
Redlands Unified School District
Rialto Unified School District
Rim Of The World Unified School District
San Bernardino City Unified School District
Silver Valley Unified School District
Snowline Joint Unified School District
Trona Joint Unified School District
Upland Unified School District
Victor Elementary School District
Victor Valley Union High School District
Yucaipa-Calimesa Joint Unified School District

San Diego County

Alpine Union School District
Bonsall Unified School District
Borrego Springs Unified School District
Cajon Valley Union School District
Cardiff School District
Carlsbad Unified School District
Chula Vista Elementary School District
Coronado Unified School District
Dehesa School District
Del Mar Union School District
Encinitas Union School District
Escondido Union High School District
Escondido Union School District
Fallbrook Union Elementary School District
Fallbrook Union High School District
Grossmont Union High School District
Jamul-Dulzura Union School District
Julian Union High School District
Julian Union School District
La Mesa-Spring Valley School District
Lakeside Union School District
Lemon Grove School District
Mountain Empire Unified School District
National School District
Oceanside Unified School District
Poway Unified School District
Ramona Unified School District
Rancho Santa Fe Elementary School District
San Diego Unified School District
San Dieguito Union High School District
San Marcos Unified School District
San Pasqual Union School District
San Ysidro School District
Santee School District
Solana Beach School District
South Bay Union School District
Spencer Valley School District
Sweetwater Union High School District
Vallecitos School District
Valley Center-Pauma Unified School District
Vista Unified School District
Warner Unified School District

San Francisco County
 San Francisco Unified School District

San Joaquin County

 Banta Elementary School District
 Escalon Unified School District
 Jefferson Elementary District
 Lammersville Joint Unified School District
 Lincoln Unified School District
 Linden Unified School District
 Lodi Unified School District
 Manteca Unified School District
 New Hope Elementary School District
 New Jerusalem Elementary School District
 Oak View Elementary School District
 Ripon Unified School District
 Stockton Unified School District
 Tracy Unified School District

San Luis Obispo County

Atascadero Unified School District
Cayucos Elementary School District
Coast Union High School District
Lucia Mar Unified School District
Paso Robles Joint Unified School District
Pleasant Valley Joint Union Elementary School District
San Luis Coastal Unified School District
San Miguel Joint Union Elementary School District
Shandon Joint Unified School District
Templeton Unified School District

San Mateo County

Bayshore Elementary School District
Belmont - Redwood Shores School District
Brisbane School District
Burlingame School District
Cabrillo Unified School District
Hillsborough City School District
Jefferson Elementary School District
Jefferson Union High School District
La Honda-Pescadero Unified School District
Las Lomitas Elementary School District
Menlo Park City School District 
Millbrae School District 
Pacifica School District
Portola Valley Elementary School District 
Ravenswood City School District 
Redwood City School District 
San Bruno Park School District 
San Carlos School District 
San Mateo Union High School District 
San Mateo-Foster City School District 
Sequoia Union High School District 
South San Francisco Unified School District 
Woodside Elementary School District

Santa Barbara County

Ballard Elementary School District
Blochman Union Elementary School District
Buellton Union Elementary School District
Carpinteria Unified School District
Cold Spring Elementary School District
College Elementary School District
Cuyama Joint Unified School District
Goleta Union Elementary School District
Guadalupe Union Elementary School District
Hope Elementary School District
Lompoc Unified School District
Los Olivos Elementary School District
Montecito Union Elementary School District
Orcutt Union Elementary School District
Santa Barbara Unified School District
Santa Maria Joint Union High School District
Santa Maria-Bonita Elementary School District
Santa Ynez Valley Union High School District
Solvang Elementary School District
Vista Del Mar Union Elementary School District

Santa Clara County

Alum Rock Union School District
Berryessa Union School District
Cambrian School District
Campbell Union School District
Campbell Union High School District
Cupertino Union School District
East Side Union High School District
Evergreen Elementary School District
Franklin-McKinley School District
Fremont Union High School District
Gilroy Unified School District
Lakeside Joint School District
Loma Prieta Joint Union Elementary School District
Los Altos School District
Los Gatos Union School District
Los Gatos-Saratoga Joint Union High School District
Luther Burbank School District
Milpitas Unified School District
Moreland School District
Morgan Hill Unified School District
Mount Pleasant Elementary School District
Mountain View-Whisman School District
Mountain View-Los Altos Union High School District
Oak Grove School District
Orchard Elementary School District
Palo Alto Unified School District
San Jose Unified School District
Santa Clara Unified School District
Saratoga Union Elementary School District
Sunnyvale Elementary School District
Union School District

Santa Cruz County

Bonny Doon School District
Happy Valley Elementary School District
Live Oak School District
Mountain School District
Pacific Elementary School District
Pajaro Valley Unified School District
San Lorenzo Valley Unified School District
Santa Cruz Elementary School District
Santa Cruz High School District
Scotts Valley Unified School District
Soquel Union Elementary School District

Shasta County

 Anderson Union High School District
 Bella Vista Elementary School District
 Black Butte Union School District
 Cascade Elementary School District
 Castle Rock Elementary School District
 Columbia Elementary School District
 Cottonwood Union Elementary School District
 Enterprise Elementary School District
 Fall River Joint Unified School District
 French Gulch-Whiskeytown Union Elementary District
 Gateway Unified School District
 Grant Elementary School District
 Happy Valley Union Elementary School District
 Igo-Ono-Platina School District
 Junction Elementary School District
 Millville Elementary School District
 Mountain Union School District
 North Cow Creek School District
 Oak Run Elementary School District
 Pacheco Union School District
 Redding School District
 Shasta Union Elementary School District
 Shasta Union High School District
 Whitmore Elementary School District

Sierra County
Sierra-Plumas Joint Unified School District

Siskiyou County

Big Springs Elementary School District
Bogus Elementary School District
Butte Valley Unified School District 
Butteville Union Elementary School District
Delphic Elementary School District
Dunsmuir Elementary School District
Dunsmuir Joint High School District
Forks of Salmon Elementary School District
Gazelle Union Elementary School District
Grenada Elementary School District
Happy Camp Union Elementary School District
Hornbrook Elementary School District
Junction Elementary School District
Klamath River Union Elementary School District
Little Shasta Elementary School District
McCloud Union Elementary School District
Montague Elementary School District
Mount Shasta Union School District 
Scott Valley Unified School District 
Seiad Elementary School District
Siskiyou Union High School District
Weed Union Elementary School District
Willow Creek Elementary School District
Yreka Union Elementary School District
Yreka Union High School District

Solano County

Benicia Unified School District 
Dixon Unified School District 
Fairfield-Suisun Unified School District 
Travis Unified School District 
Vacaville Unified School District 
Vallejo City Unified School District

Sonoma County

Alexander Valley Union School District
Bellevue Union Elementary School District
Bennett Valley Union School District
Cinnabar School District
Cloverdale Unified School District 
Cotati-Rohnert Park Unified School District
 Dunham School District
Forestville School District
Fort Ross School District
Geyserville Unified School District
Gravenstein Union School District
Guerneville School District
Harmony Union School District
Healdsburg Unified School District
Horicon School District 
Kashia School District
Kenwood School District
Liberty School District Petaluma
Mark West Union School District
Monte Rio Union School District
Montgomery School District
Oak Grove Union School District
Old Adobe Union School District
Petaluma City Elementary School District
Petaluma Joint Union High School District
Piner-Olivet Union School District
Rincon Valley Union School District
Roseland School District (California)
Santa Rosa Elementary School District
Santa Rosa High School District
Sebastopol Union School District
Sonoma Valley Unified School District
Twin Hills Union School District
Two Rock Union School District
Waugh School District 
West Side Union School District (Sonoma County)
West Sonoma County Union High School District
Wilmar Union School District
Windsor Unified School District
Wright Elementary School District

Stanislaus County

Ceres Unified School District
Chatom Union School District
Denair Unified School District
Empire Union School District
Gratton School District
Hart-Ransom Union School District
Hickman Community Charter School District
Hughson Unified School District
Keyes Union School District
Knights Ferry Elementary School District
Modesto City Elementary School District
Modesto City High School District
Newman-Crows Landing Unified School District
Oakdale Joint Unified School District
Paradise Elementary School District
Patterson Joint Unified School District
Riverbank Unified School District
Roberts Ferry School District
Salida Union School District
Shiloh School District
Stanislaus Union School District
Sylvan Union School District
Turlock School Districts
Valley Home Joint School District
Waterford Unified School District

Sutter County

Brittan Elementary School District
Browns Elementary School District
East Nicolaus Joint Union High School District
Franklin Elementary School District
Live Oak Unified School District
Marcum-Illinois Union Elementary School District
Meridian Elementary School District
Nuestro Elementary School District
Pleasant Grove Joint Union Elementary School District
Sutter Union High School District
Winship-Robbins Elementary School District
Yuba City Unified School District

Tehama County

Antelope School District
Corning Union Elementary School District
Corning Union High School District
Evergreen Union School District
Flournoy Union School District
Gerber Union Elementary School District
Kirkwood School District (California)
Lassen View Union Elementary School District
Los Molinos Unified School District
Red Bluff Union Elementary School District
Red Bluff Joint Union High School District
Reeds Creek Elementary School District
Richfield Elementary School District

Trinity County

Burnt Ranch Elementary School District
Coffee Creek Elementary School District 
Douglas City Elementary School District 
Junction City School District 
Lewiston Elementary School District 
Mountain Valley Unified School District
Southern Trinity Joint Unified School District 
Trinity Alps Unified School District 
Trinity Center School District

Tulare County

Allensworth School District
Alpaugh Unified School District
Alta Vista School District
Buena Vista Elementary School District
Burton School District
Columbine School District
Cutler-Orosi Unified School District
Dinuba Unified School District
Ducor School District
Earlimart School District
Exeter Unified School District
Farmersville Unified School District
Hope School District
Hot Springs Elementary School District
Kings River School District
Liberty School District
Lindsay Unified School District
Monson-Sultana School District
Oak Valley School District
Outside Creek School District
Palo Verde School District
Pixley School District
Pleasant View School District
Porterville Unified School District
Richgrove School District
Rockford School District
Saucelito School District
Sequoia Union School District
Springville School District
Stone Corral School District
Strathmore School District
Sundale School District
Sunnyside School District
Terra Bella School District
Three Rivers Union School District
Tipton School District
Traver School District
Tulare City School District
Tulare High School District
Visalia Unified School District
Waukena School District
Woodlake Unified School District
Woodville School District

Tuolumne County

Belleview School District
Big Oak Flat-Groveland Unified School District
Columbia Union School District
Curtis Creek School District
Jamestown School District
Sonora School District
Sonora Union High School District
Soulsbyville School District
Summerville School District
Summerville Union High School District
Twain Harte-Long Barn Union School District

Ventura County

 Briggs Elementary School District
 Conejo Valley Unified School District
 Fillmore Unified School District
 Hueneme Elementary School District
 Mesa Union School District
 Moorpark Unified School District
 Mupu School District
 Oak Park Unified School District
 Ocean View Elementary School District
 Ojai Unified School District
 Oxnard Elementary School District
 Oxnard Union High School District
 Pleasant Valley School District
 Rio School District
 Santa Clara Elementary School District
 Santa Paula Unified School District
 Simi Valley Unified School District
 Somis Union School District
 Ventura Unified School District

Yolo County

Davis Joint Unified School District
Esparto School District
Washington Unified School District 
Winters Joint Unified School District
Woodland Joint Unified School District

Yuba County

Camptonville School District
Marysville Joint Unified School District
Plumas Elementary School District
Wheatland Elementary School District
Wheatland Union High School District

See also
Education in the United States
Lists of school districts in the United States
List of closed secondary schools in California

References

External links
California school districts Look up test scores, parent reviews and teacher & student stats for any school in California.

 
School districts
California
School districts